William Joseph McCaffrey (October 9, 1914 – February 13, 2006) was a United States Army Lieutenant General and the father of retired General Barry McCaffrey.

Early life and education
McCaffrey enlisted in the Army on 24 April 1934. He started at West Point in 1935, graduating as a Second Lieutenant in 1939.

Military service

World War II
McCaffrey graduated from the Command and General Staff School in 1943. He then served as chief of staff of the 92nd Infantry Division in Europe.

Korean War
McCaffrey served as deputy chief of staff X Corps.

He assumed command of the 31st Infantry Regiment when its commander was killed in the Battle of Chosin Reservoir and led them in the retreat to Hungnam.

McCaffrey graduated from the United States Army War College in 1953. He later served as Commandant of the Army War College from 15 September 1967 to 6 July 1969.

He serves as assistant commandant of cadets at the U.S. Military Academy from 1953 to 1956 and then as commandant of cadets at The Citadel from 1959 to 1961.

Vietnam War
He served as Deputy Commander United States Army Vietnam from 1970-72.

Later life
He retired from the Army in 1973.

McCaffrey died of heart disease on 13 February 2006. He was buried at Arlington National Cemetery on 21 February 2006.

References

1914 births
2006 deaths
People from Omaha, Nebraska
United States Army soldiers
Military personnel from Nebraska
United States Military Academy alumni
United States Army personnel of World War II
United States Army Command and General Staff College alumni
Recipients of the Silver Star
Recipients of the Legion of Merit
United States Army personnel of the Korean War
United States Army War College alumni
United States Army generals
United States Army personnel of the Vietnam War
Recipients of the Air Medal
People from Arlington County, Virginia
Burials at Arlington National Cemetery